Donnersbach is a former municipality in the district of Liezen in the Austrian state of Styria. Since the 2015 Styria municipal structural reform, it is part of the municipality Irdning-Donnersbachtal.

Geography
Donnersbach lies in a southern tributary valley of the Enns in the Niederen Tauern.

References

Rottenmann and Wölz Tauern
Cities and towns in Liezen District